Xiphophyllum may refer to:
 Xiphophyllum (katydid), a genus of katydids in the family Tettigoniidae
 Xiphophyllum, a former genus of plants in the family Orchidaceae; now a synonym of Cephalanthera

 Acacia xiphophylla, commonly known as snakewood, a tree in the family Fabaceae
 Cephalanthera xiphophyllum, a species of orchid